Erik Martin Gunnar Håkansson (23 July 1926 – 4 August 2009) was a featherweight Greco-Roman wrestler from Sweden who won a bronze medal at the 1955 World Championships. He competed at the 1952 and 1956 Olympics and finished fifth in 1956.

References

1926 births
2009 deaths
Olympic wrestlers of Sweden
Wrestlers at the 1952 Summer Olympics
Wrestlers at the 1956 Summer Olympics
Swedish male sport wrestlers
World Wrestling Championships medalists
Sportspeople from Malmö